Fortune's Fool may refer to:
Fortune's Fool (novel)
Fortune's Fool (1796 play)
Fortune's Fool (1848 play)